A hoverboard (or hover board) is a levitating board used for personal transportation,  first described in science-fiction, and made famous by the appearance of a skateboard-like hoverboard in the film Back to the Future Part II. Many attempts have been made to invent a functioning hoverboard.

In fiction
Hoverboards were first described by author M. K. Joseph in a 1967 science fiction novel. In 1984, a hoverboard appeared in the shoot 'em up arcade video game SWAT, developed by Coreland and distributed by Sega in Japan and Bally Midway in North America.

The hoverboard was popularized by the Back to the Future film franchise, with its appearance in Back to the Future Part II (1989). During the 1990s there were rumors, fueled by the film's director Robert Zemeckis, that hoverboards were in fact real, but not marketed because they were deemed too dangerous by parents' groups. These rumors have been conclusively debunked.

Hoverboards have appeared in various other media since the 1990s. For example, video games such as the beat 'em up arcade game Riding Fight (1992), manufactured by Taito, and the sports video game AirBlade (2001), developed by Criterion Games and distributed by Sony in Europe and Namco in North America.

Prototypes
Numerous attempts have been made to create working hoverboards.

Air cushion or ground effect 
Several companies have drawn on hovercraft "air-cushion vehicle" technology to attempt to create hoverboard-like products but none have demonstrated similar experiences to the kinds of levitation depicted in science fiction films.

In the 1950s Hiller aircraft produced the "Flying Platform" which was similar to the modern concept of a hoverboard.

The Airboard air-cushion vehicle was unveiled in the 2000 Summer Olympics Opening Ceremony in Sydney, which was manufactured and sold by Arbortech Industries Limited. Series II was unveiled in 2007.

In 2004, Jamie Hyneman and his team built a makeshift hovercraft for MythBusters, dubbed the Hyneman Hoverboard, from a surfboard and leafblower. However, Jamie's hoverboard was not very effective.

In 2005, Jason Bradbury created a "hoverboard" for The Gadget Show, using a wooden board that was levitated by means of a leafblower. The original design was not propelled and could also not be steered. In 2009, a second version was made which was propelled/steered by a small jet engine (rather than a fan as with an air boat), and also contained two (more powerful) leafblowers.

Video of the flight leading to a controlled splash-down is offered. Duru had designed and constructed the hoverboard himself over the course of a year. Its lift is generated by propellers, and the pilot controls the craft with his feet.

It has 36 electric motors that power 36 fans.

In April 2016, a jet powered Flyboard Air hoverboard, flown by inventor Franky Zapata broke the Guinness World Record for farthest flight by hoverboard, flying .

In July 2019, Franky Zapata flew the newer Flyboard Air "jet-powered personal aerial vehicle", referred to as the EZ-Fly, during Bastille Day celebrations in France. On 4 August 2019, Zapata succeeded in crossing the English Channel with his device. The previous attempt on 25 July had been unsuccessful, but during the second try, escorted by French Army helicopters and using a backpack fuel reservoir, he accomplished the  journey in about 20 minutes, including a fueling stop at the midpoint.

Zapata's company, Z-AIR, had received a €1.3m development grant from the French military in December 2018. However, he has said that the flyboard was not yet suitable for military use due to the noise it creates and the challenge of learning how to fly the device.

Magnetic 
In 2011, French artist Nils Guadagnin created a hovering board that floats by magnetic repulsion between it and its base but cannot carry a load. The board includes a laser system which ensures stabilization, in addition to an electromagnetic system which makes the levitation possible.

In October 2014, American inventor Greg Henderson demonstrated a prototype hoverboard working on a magnetic levitation system using the electrodynamic wheel principle. Four engines were used to power the magnetic levitation, with the option of applying thrust and spin to the board under user control. The prototype was promoted in a campaign on Kickstarter the day of the news coverage, with a price of $10,000 for the first ten boards. The New York Times said that although the board worked, Greg Henderson had no personal interest in skateboarding and that the Kickstarter was "basically a publicity stunt," designed to call attention to his company.

On 24 June 2015, Lexus released a video as part of their "Amazing in Motion" series purporting to show a real hoverboard they had developed, the Slide. It was stated by Lexus that the board worked using liquid-nitrogen-cooled superconductors and permanent magnets. The board was shown moving over a conventional-looking concrete skateboard park surface, which led to some skepticism. Lexus apparently later admitted that it only works on special metallic surfaces and the surface shown was not just concrete. On August 4, 2015, Lexus revealed the working principles of the Slide hoverboard with a promotional campaign, filmed in Barcelona and starring Ross McGouran, a professional London skateboarder. Lexus released a series of videos explaining the technology and the whole engineering, research, and development process in association with all its partners.

Other 

In March 2014, a company called HUVr claimed to have developed the technology for hoverboards, and released a video advertising the product on YouTube featuring Christopher Lloyd, Tony Hawk, Moby, Terrell Owens, and others riding hoverboards through a parking lot in Los Angeles. Special effect failures such as incomplete wire removal have conclusively identified the video as a hoax or joke, traced to the Funny or Die website through identification of the cast and public references to the project. Funny or Die later posted a video featuring Christopher Lloyd "apologizing" for the hoax.

Rumors circulated in 2001 that inventor Dean Kamen's new invention, codenamed Ginger, was a transportation device resembling a hoverboard. In reality, Ginger was the Segway Human Transporter, a self-balancing two-wheel electric scooter.

Guinness records
Guinness World Records defines a hoverboard as an autonomously powered personal levitator. 

In popular culture

Back to the Future

Back to the Future franchise: Marty McFly (Michael J. Fox) rides a Mattel hoverboard in Back to the Future Part II (1989), to escape Griff Tannen and his gang in the year 2015. Later on, Marty McFly would revisit 1955 and use the hoverboard to steal the Grays Sports Almanac book back from Biff Tannen, to prevent him from taking over Hill Valley.

In Part III (1990), in the year 1885, Doc Brown rides the hoverboard to rescue Clara from falling off the locomotive.

In the one-off special Doc Brown Saves the World, Doc reveals that he erased the existence of the hoverboard and other inventions from the 2015 shown in the series as they contributed to a chain of events that culminated in Griff Tannen triggering a nuclear holocaust.
 In a short film called Hoverboard (2011), a girl watches Part II and makes a hoverboard of her own.
 In Back to the Future: The Game, Marty uses a hoverboard to help Doc catch Edna Strickland, one of the game's main villains and return her to 1931.

Other
 In the 1986 The Transformers: The Movie, there is a scene where Daniel Witwicky rides a hoverboard.
 In the 1998 film Futuresport, a hoverboard is used by Dean Cain's character.
 In the Warframe Fortuna Expansion, a new type of vehicle called a K-Drive was released. This vehicle functions exactly as a hoverboard.
 In the 2002 Disney animated film Treasure Planet, Jim Hawkins rides a hoverboard also known as a solar surfer with a sail doing daredevil stunts in the mines. Later on, Jim Hawkins quickly constructs a hoverboard and uses it to reach the portal door controls.
 In the 2004 CGI animated film Pinocchio 3000, Mayor Scamboli, Marlene, Cab, and Rodo all ride hoverboards at the opening of Scamboland.
 In the 2006 Sonic the Hedgehog video game Sonic Riders, the characters use modified hoverboards as a racing vehicle.
 In the 1999 video game TrickStyle, the characters use hoverboards as a racing vehicle.
 In the 2012 mobile game Subway Surfers, a "hoverboard" is used as the character's vehicle. There are many variations of the hoverboard in-game including "Teleporter", "Hot Rod", "Bouncer" and others.

See also
 Flyboard
 Hoverbike
 Ionocraft, a propulsion device with similar operation to a hoverboard, but requires tethering to its power supply as its thrust-to-weight ratio is too low to also lift it
 Lexus hoverboard

References

External links

 

Fictional vehicles
Back to the Future (franchise) technology
Fictional elements introduced in 1989